Mayersville is a town on the east bank of the Mississippi River, and the county seat for Issaquena County, Mississippi, United States. It is located in the Mississippi Delta region, known for cotton cultivation in the antebellum era. Once the trading center for the county, the town was superseded when railroads were built into the area. The population of the majority-black town was 547 at the 2010 census, down from 795 at the 2000 census.

History 

Native Americans had lived in this area since prehistoric times. The Mayersville Archeological Site, added to the National Register of Historic Places in 1980, is on privately owned land. It contains the remains of earthwork mounds constructed primarily in the Mayersville phase ( 1200–1400) of the earlier Mississippian culture. 

A 1950 survey by Philip Phillips of the Peabody Museum of Archaeology and Ethnology reported eleven ancient mounds. By the time the site was nominated by the state to the National Register of Historic Places, two mounds had been completely destroyed, a third one was nearly gone, three were reduced in size by plowing, and five remained nearly as described. The fourth side was bounded by three mounds. Among these was Mound I, which was found to have been re-occupied from 1400 to 1600, perhaps by the succeeding Choctaw people. A European-American family cemetery associated with a 19th-century plantation was developed on Mound A.

The first record of non-Native settlement was in 1830, when European-American Ambrose Gipson purchased a large body of land along the Mississippi River and founded "Gipson's Landing". This soon became the port on the river for shipping out the cotton of Issaquena and Sharkey counties. It attracted shifting populations of river crews, gamblers, and traders, as well as show boats during low water times. The shipping records for David Mayer, who owned nearby Mout Level Plantation, show that river freight was shipped from the port via steamboat to points in Arkansas, Louisiana, Missouri, and Mississippi.

Mayer purchased Gipson's Landing in 1870, and the town of Mayersville was founded in 1871. The town was established in 1872 by the legislature as the Issaquena County seat.

In January 1885, black saloon keeper Ebenzer Fowler was rumored to have sent an insulting letter to a white woman in the town. An armed white posse confronted Fowler on the main street just before dark on January 30, 1885. They claimed that Fowler grabbed a gun from a posse member and fired a shot at them; they returned fire and shot him dead. Tension between the town's blacks, a majority of the population, and whites flared following the shooting. The county sheriff called in 22 members of Vicksburg's militia, the "Volunteer Southrons", for assistance. The militia left the following day when tensions had eased.

Mayersville's popularity as a shipping port began to decline in the mid-1800s when it had to compete with the railways being built across the South, though no railway was built to the town. The construction of a levee following the hugely destructive flood of 1927 cut off direct river access for the town, causing further decline. In the 21st century, Bunge North America operates a large grain port in Millers Landing north of town.

In 1958, the current county courthouse in Mayersville was built.

With federal legislation in the mid-1960s, African Americans regained the ability to register and vote. In 1976, famed civil rights activist Unita Blackwell was elected mayor of Mayersville and the first female African-American mayor in Mississippi.

Mayersville's small population and quiet character are in sharp contrast to its years as a booming Mississippi River port.

Geography
Mayersville is in northern Issaquena County, just east of the Mississippi River, from which it is separated by a levee. Mississippi Highway 1 passes through the town, leading north  to Greenville and south  to U.S. Route 61 at Onward. Mississippi Highway 14 has its western terminus in Mayersville and runs out of town to the northeast with Highway 1. Highway 14 leads east  to US-61 at Rolling Fork.

Demographics

2020 census

As of the 2020 United States Census, there were 433 people, 155 households, and 66 families residing in the town.

2013 ACS
As of the 2013 American Community Survey, there were 652 people living in the town, a decline since 2000. The remaining population is increasingly African American. 90.2% were African American, 9.7% White and 0.2% from some other race. 0.2% were Hispanic or Latino of any race.

2000 census
As of the census of 2000, there were 795 people, 190 households, and 126 families living in the town. The population density was 710.7 people per square mile (274.1/km2). There were 212 housing units at an average density of 189.5 per square mile (73.1/km2). The racial makeup of the town was 88.05% Black or African American, 11.95% White, and 0.13% Hispanic or Latino.

There were 190 households, out of which 40.5% had children under the age of 18 living with them, 26.3% were married couples living together, 31.1% had a female householder with no husband present, and 33.2% were non-families. 31.1% of all households were made up of individuals, and 13.7% had someone living alone who was 65 years of age or older. The average household size was 2.80 and the average family size was 3.53.

In the town, the population was spread out, with 26.4% under the age of 18, 16.0% from 18 to 24, 36.9% from 25 to 44, 13.7% from 45 to 64, and 7.0% who were 65 years of age or older. The median age was 29 years. For every 100 females, there were 165.9 males. For every 100 females age 18 and over, there were 228.7 males.

The median income for a household in the town was $10,962, and the median income for a family was $15,208. Males had a median income of $20,917 versus $15,875 for females. The per capita income for the town was $7,287. About 41.6% of families and 49.9% of the population were below the poverty line, including 62.6% of those under age 18 and 51.4% of those age 65 or over.

Education
The town of Mayersville is served by the South Delta School District.

Notable people

 Unita Blackwell, civil rights leader and mayor of Mayersville from 1976-2001; first female African-American mayor in Mississippi.
 Hazlewood Power Farish, Mississippi state senator from 1908 to 1912
 William Stamps Farish II, president of Standard Oil.
 Anthony Harris, professional football defensive tackle
 Elza Jeffords, U.S. Representative from Mississippi's 3rd congressional district from 1883 to 1885
 Willis Elbert Mollison (1859-1924), attorney and first African-American district attorney in Mississippi; migrated to Chicago between 1910 and 1920, where he continued to work at law.
Henry Sterling Sias, Sr. - Farmer and educator, devout civil rights activist. Began one of the first famed Freedom Schools after four of his children were expelled from school for wearing SNCC pins and refusing to take them off.  He housed and facilitated civil rights notables, such as Stokley Carmichael, Marion Wright, Robert Wright, Ivanhoe Donelson, Charles Cobb, Willie Rollins and Louis Grant. He attended the Democratic Freedom Party Convention in Atlantic City with Fannie Lou Hamer.

References

Towns in Issaquena County, Mississippi
Mississippi populated places on the Mississippi River
Towns in Mississippi
County seats in Mississippi
1830 establishments in Mississippi